Haitian Canadians are Canadian citizens of Haitian descent or Haiti-born people who reside in Canada. As of 2016, more than 86% of Haitian Canadians reside in Quebec.

Haitian Migration to Canada

Immigration

1960-1980 
Immigration from Haiti to Quebec started in 1963. Haitian settlement in the Quebec municipality Montreal increased about 40% between the late 1960s and the early 1970s. Immigration data from 1968 shows that Haiti placed fifteenth in overall origin countries outputting migrants to Quebec; in addition, Haiti had 1.6% of the total immigration percentage of Quebec in 1968. In the span of five years, Haiti became the 2nd overall source country for Quebec immigration, possessing 8.4% of the total immigration percentage of Quebec in 1973.

The impact of Nationalism and Political Tension in Haiti on Immigration 
The migration of Haitian immigrants between 1969 and 1974 can be understood through the political institutions in place within Haiti at the time. Haiti was governed by way of a dictatorship, led by Francois Duvalier. Duvalier had been contested by the left-leaning Unified Party of Haitian Communists, who failed in resisting Duvalier's authoritarian regime. Duvalier's death and the subsequent succession of his son Jean-Claude Duvalier led to the notion of “patriotic action”, a declaration of nationalism directed towards Haitian Canadian and Haitian American immigrants, as well as a call to action in assisting their Haitian brethren. Haitian Canadians joined forces with their home country brethren in some cases to assist in the "“resolution of the Haitian crisis” and to attempt to establish greater leftist political power. The idea of “patriotic action” finalized with the potential deportation faced by around 700 Haitian Canadians from 1972 to 1973. These Haitian Québécois joined forces under a protest movement in regards to their rights as citizens; these protests were organized by the Christian community of Haitians of Montreal.

Demographics

Haitian Canadians by Canadian province or territory (2016)

Notable Haitian Canadians

See also

 Canada–Haiti relations
 Haitian Americans
 Haitian diaspora
 Black Canadians in Montreal
 Roxham Road, unofficial border crossing used irregularly by many Haitians temporarily in the U.S. to seek asylum in Canada during 2017

References

External links
The Haitian Community in Canada
Multicultural Canada: Haitians
Haitian Consulate General in Montreal
Montreal International Haitian Film Festival
Quebec Government Portal: Relations with Haiti
Article on Haitian immigration to Quebec

Ethnic groups in Canada

Caribbean Canadian
Immigration to Quebec